The Asia-Pacific Financial Plaza is a  tall skyscraper in Lingya District of Kaohsiung, Taiwan. It was completed in 1992 and was designed by Hoy Architects & Associates. It was the first building in Taiwan to reach a height of 150 m.

History
After its completion in April 1992, the Asia-Pacific Financial Plaza became the tallest building in Taiwan surpassing the 143.4 meters high Tuntex Tower in Taipei. However, it only kept this title for 3 months when the Chang-Gu World Trade Center in Kaohsiung was completed on 9 July 1992.

See also
 List of tallest buildings in Asia
 List of tallest buildings in Kaohsiung
 List of tallest buildings in Taiwan

References

1992 establishments in Taiwan
Office buildings completed in 1992
Skyscraper office buildings in Kaohsiung